Listed below are the presidential proclamations signed by United States President Joe Biden, beginning with Proclamation 10140.

, President Biden has signed 390 presidential proclamations.

Presidential proclamations
Cumulative number of proclamations signed by Joe Biden

2021

2022

2023

References

Sources

 

2020s politics-related lists
2021-related lists
2021 beginnings
Presidency of Joe Biden
United States federal policy
Proclamations